A barbarous name is a meaningless or seemingly meaningless word used in magic rituals.  The term barbarous comes from the Greek barbaroi meaning those who do not speak the Greek Language (barbarians).  Often these names were derived from foreign sources and acquired their "barbarous" nature from the magician's lack of understanding of that language.

Many ancient barbarous names were of Egyptian origin, though there were plenty of Hebrew and Persian names that were corrupted by transcription into Greek.  They appear throughout the Greek Magical Papyri, a notable example being "ablanathanalba."

Iamblichus discusses barbarous names, warning magicians not to translate them even if their original meaning is discovered, due to the belief that the power of the names resided in their sound, not their meaning.  The term also appears in the Chaldean Oracles.

By the medieval period most were from Greek and Hebrew sources, such as "anexhexeton."  Gemistus Pletho censored references to barbarous names (as well as Christianity) in Michael Psellos's copy of the Chaldean Oracles.

The Enochian language of John Dee and Edward Kelley introduced a variety of barbarous names to modern magical practice.

In the modern era, Aleister Crowley, like Iamblichus before him, argued that the supposed effectiveness of barbarous names rested in their utterance, not their meaning.

See also
Abracadabra
Abrahadabra
Astrotheology
Magical formula

References 

Barbarians
Ceremonial magic
Magic words